This article contains a list of people who have served as mayor of Pula, the largest city in Istria County, and the sixth largest city in Croatia, since the establishment of the Republic of Croatia. For a complete list of all chief magistrates of Pula, see Chief Executive of Pula.

See also
Chief Executive of Pula
List of mayors in Croatia

Sources
Grad Pula - Upravljali su Pulom od 1186. godine 
Glas Istre - svi pulski gradonačelnici od 1947 do danas

References

Pula
History of Croatia